San Juan de Girón (better known as Girón), formerly: Villa de los Caballeros de Girón, is a municipality of the Santander Department, which is part of the Bucaramanga Metropolitan area in northeastern Colombia.

Girón was declared a Colombian Pueblo Patrimonio (heritage town) by the Colombian government in 2010.

References

Municipalities of Santander Department